From Q with Love is a two volume compilation album by Quincy Jones. It was released on February 9, 1999 through Warner Bros. Records.

Track listing

See also
Quincy Jones discography

Quincy Jones albums
1999 albums
Warner Records albums
Albums arranged by Quincy Jones
Albums produced by Quincy Jones